Musnad al Tayalisi, or Musnad Abu Dawood al-Tayalisi or Musnad Abi Dawud Al Tayalisi, is one of the oldest Hadith book written and compiled. It was compiled by Imam Abu Dawood Al-Tayalisi  (Sulaymān ibn Dāwūd, 133 H/750-1 CE? – Rabī` I 204 H/viii-ix.819 CE?).

Description
The book contains almost three thousand (3000) hadiths according to Maktaba Shamila. It is one of the oldest Musnad ( a Hadith book with full isnāds, also organized by Companion) written. It is written in the second century of the Islamic Calendar and written before the most authentic book of Hadiths (narrations of Muhammad) that are Sahihain (Sahih al-Bukhari & Sahih Muslim). The Musnad (مسند) are collections of Hadiths which are classified by narrators, and therefore by Sahabas (companions of Prophet Muhammad). It seems that the collection is not directly the work of the Imam, but what his pupil Yunus ibn Habib assembled from what the Sheikh transmitted to him.

Publications
The book has been published by many organizations around the world: 
  Musnad Abi Dawud al-Tayalisi Commentary by Sulayman ibn Dawud Tayalisi: Published: abebooks | UK

See also
 List of Sunni books
 Kutub al-Sittah
 Sahih Muslim
 Jami al-Tirmidhi
 Sunan Abu Dawood
 Jami' at-Tirmidhi
 Sunan ibn Majah
 Muwatta Malik

References

9th-century Arabic books
10th-century Arabic books
Sunni literature
Hadith
Hadith collections
Sunni hadith collections